Abdullah Nasser (born 20 August 1998), is an Emirati professional footballer who plays as a left back for UAE Pro League side Al-Nasr.

Career statistics

Club

Career statistics

References

External links
 

1998 births
Living people
Emirati footballers
Association football fullbacks
Sharjah FC players
Fujairah FC players
Al-Nasr SC (Dubai) players
UAE Pro League players